The broad-footed climbing mouse (Rhipidomys latimanus) is a species of rodent in the family Cricetidae. It is found in Colombia, Ecuador, Panama and Peru.

References

Rhipidomys
Mammals of Colombia
Mammals described in 1860
Taxonomy articles created by Polbot